Lohsestraße is a station on the Cologne Stadtbahn lines 12 and 15, located in the Cologne district of Nippes. The station lies on Neusser Straße, adjacent to nearby Lohsestraße, after which the station is named.

The station was opened in 1974 and consists of two side platforms with two rail tracks.

See also 
 List of Cologne KVB stations

External links 
 station info page 

Cologne KVB stations
Nippes, Cologne
Cologne-Bonn Stadtbahn stations
Railway stations in Germany opened in 1974